The 1990 Arkansas gubernatorial election took place on November 6, 1990. 

Incumbent Democratic Governor Bill Clinton won re-election in a two-way race against Democrat turned Republican Sheffield Nelson with more than 57% of the vote. This was Clinton's fourth consecutive, and fifth overall, term as Governor of Arkansas, as well as his final term (he was elected to the presidency in 1992). Nelson had defeated Representative Tommy F. Robinson for the Republican nomination.

References

1990
Arkansas
Gubernatorial
Bill Clinton